The A Very Potter Sequel cast extended play (EP) contains songs from the musical A Very Potter Sequel, sequel to the Harry Potter parody musical A Very Potter Musical, produced by StarKid Productions with music and lyrics by Darren Criss (who also starred in both musicals as Harry Potter) and book by Matt Lang, Nick Lang, and Brian Holden, that were not released on A Very StarKid Album. The EP was released digitally on July 31, 2010, through the group's Bandcamp site.

Track listing

Personnel

Featured Performers

Band
 Bruce Keisling – piano
 Clark Baxtresser – keyboard
 Chris Lorentz – bass guitar
 Corey Richardson – lead guitar
 Jack Stratton – drums

References

External links
 StarKid Productions official website
 StarKid Productions on YouTube

Works based on Harry Potter
StarKid Productions albums
Cast recordings
Theatre soundtracks
2010 soundtrack albums
2010 EPs
Fantasy parodies